Emeka Opara  (born 2 December 1984) is a Nigerian football striker. He is a classic centre-forward with pace and very strong in the air. He most recently played for the Azerbaijan Premier League side Qarabağ.

Career 
In 2006, he had an impressive run of form in the CAF Confederation Cup while playing for Tunisian club Étoile Sportive du Sahel, taking them to the final of the competition, whilst netting eight goals.

In January 2012, Opara left FK Khazar Lankaran, and signed a six-month contract with Al Naser of the Kuwaiti Premier League. In March 2013, Opara returned to the Azerbaijan Premier League, signing for FK Qarabağ.

Career statistics

References 

1984 births
Nigerian footballers
Living people
1. FC Kaiserslautern players
Expatriate footballers in Germany
Nigerian expatriate sportspeople in Tunisia
Expatriate footballers in Tunisia
Étoile Sportive du Sahel players
Rangers International F.C. players
Pepsi Football Academy players
Nigerian expatriate sportspeople in Azerbaijan
2. Bundesliga players
Association football forwards
Sportspeople from Imo State